Jebal Ad-dhahr is a mountain of the Madiyan Mountains in Tabuk Region of Saudi Arabia. It is located near the town of Haql at 29°10′36″N 35°27′17″E. It has a height of 1,828 m (5,997 ft).

References

Dhahr
Geology of Saudi Arabia
Volcanism of Saudi Arabia